"The Intro and The Outro" is a recording by the Bonzo Dog Doo-Dah Band.  It appears on their debut album, Gorilla (1967). It is not so much a song as a comic monologue in which the speaker introduces the musicians who ostensibly appear on the recording. The recording fades out before the emcee completes the introductions and without the "orchestra" being able to play anything more than a vamp. The piece was written by Bonzo member Vivian Stanshall, who also provides the vocal. Stanshall first introduces the seven members of the Bonzo Dog Doo-Dah Band, who are credited with their actual instruments, over a vamp that resembles Duke Ellington’s "C Jam Blues".

Following that, the imaginary line-up turns toward comedy. Some of the “musicians” named are actual performers credited with instruments that they did not play or typically were not associated with. Others are actors, politicians and other public figures not generally linked with musical performance in any way. Some of those named will now be unfamiliar to listeners outside mid-20th century Britain, such as Billy Butlin, Val Doonican, Max Jaffa and the comic strip character Lord Snooty from The Beano. Peter Scott, credited as playing the duck call, was a well-known British ornithologist.

Personnel
According to Stanshall's monologue the Bonzos play the following instruments on the recording, although several of the band were multi-instrumentalists and may play other instruments as well.

"Legs" Larry Smith — drums
Martin "Sam Spoons" Ash — rhythm pole
Vernon Dudley Bohay-Nowell — bass guitar
Neil Innes — piano
Rodney Slater — alto saxophone
Roger Ruskin Spear — tenor saxophone
Vivian Stanshall — trumpet, spoken vocals

As well as being mentioned in Stanshall's patter as playing the ukulele, Eric Clapton actually plays the ukulele on the recording.

Mentioned in the recording

 John Wayne – xylophone
 Robert Morley – guitar
 Billy Butlin – spoons
 Adolf Hitler – vibes ("looking very relaxed")
 Princess Anne – sousaphone
 Liberace – clarinet
 Garner Ted Armstrong – vocals
 Lord Snooty and his Pals – tap dancing
 Harold Wilson – violin
 Franklyn MacCormack – harmonica
 Eric Clapton – ukulele
 Sir Kenneth Clark – bass saxophone
 A sessions gorilla – vox humana
 The Incredible Shrinking Man – euphonium
 Peter Scott – duck call
 Casanova – horn
 General Charles de Gaulle – accordion
 Roy Rogers on Trigger
 Wild Man of Borneo – bongos
 Count Basie Orchestra – triangle
 The Rawlinsons – trombone
 Dan Druff – harp
 Quasimodo – bells
 Brainiac – banjo
 Val Doonican – "as himself"
 Max Jaffa – very appealing
 Zebra Kid and Horace Batchelor – percussion
 J. Arthur Rank – gong

Controversies
The "sessions gorilla" portion of the recording originally ran "And now just arriving, Quintin Hogg on pig grunt". Hogg was a British politician at the time. He learned of the piece prior to its release and objected to his name being used in such a context, namely the pun on his last name as "hog" (with one "g") is also another term for a pig. He managed to get Stanshall back into the studio to record the line about the sessions gorilla that is heard on the final recording. It is not known if any copies of the original version still exist. Controversy also grew out of the juxtaposition of The Princess Anne with Hitler.

Cultural references
Vivian Stanshall is also known for appearing as the “Master of Ceremonies” on Mike Oldfield’s original recording of Tubular Bells, a role which involved introducing the instruments featured in the recording, most of which were played by Oldfield.

An excerpt of the song, with an adapted commentary sounding like Stanshall (actually performed by Bob Monkhouse), was used in a 1988 television advertisement, made at Passion Pictures and animated by Chuck Gammage, for the Cadbury Creme Egg.

References

External links
 

Bonzo Dog Doo-Dah Band songs
1967 songs
Songs written by Vivian Stanshall